Schönbrunn may refer to:
Schönbrunn Palace in Vienna, Austria
Schönbrunn Zoo in Schönbrunn Palace gardens
Schönbrunn Station of the Vienna U-Bahn
Schönbrunn (Baden), a municipality in Rhein-Neckar, Baden-Württemberg, Germany
Schönbrunn (Fichtelgebirge), a village in the Fichtelgebirge mountains in Bavaria, Germany
Schönbrunn im Steigerwald, a municipality in Bamberg, Bavaria, Germany
Schoenbrunn Village State Memorial in Ohio, United States